Carol MacReady is an English actress. She is perhaps best known for the role of Mrs Dribelle in Bodger and Badger. She was often cast as matronly, authority and mother figures such as Mrs. Atkins in Danger: Marmalade at Work, Madge in Victoria Wood's play "The Library", Susan Speed in Waiting For God, Mrs. Daws in The Darling Buds of May, Elizabeth in The Ghostbusters of East Finchley, Agnes Wilford in 102 Dalmatians (2000), Olga in My Family and Ethel in Doc Martin. One of her earlier notable roles was in the Play for Today story Schmoedipus (1974) written by Dennis Potter. In 1996, she was memorably cast as Mrs. Tinker, the paranoid mother of Alice Tinker in The Vicar of Dibley episode "The Christmas Lunch Incident". More recently, she has appeared as Mrs. Norcliffe in Gentleman Jack and Irene Hickson in two episodes of Strike.

On stage, she has appeared in several productions with the Royal Shakespeare Company, including Love in a Wood as Mrs. Joiner, Barthomlew Fair  as Ursula and Roberto Zucco as Madam  She has also featured in several plays at the National Theatre, including The Mandate as Tamara  and Tales From the Vienna Woods as First Aunt.

Selected filmography

External links
 
 Carol MacReady at Theatricalia

References

English television actresses
Year of birth missing (living people)
Living people